Thomas Hendry (25 December 1866 - March 1939) was a Scottish rugby union international who represented Scotland in the 1893 Home Nations Championship and in the 1895 Home Nations Championship

The son of Patrick Hendry and Elizabeth Haining Laurie, he grew up in the Cathcart area of Glasgow. He became a Cotton Yarn merchant.

He played as a forward for Clydesdale RFC and also represented Glasgow District. He played in December 1893 inter-city match against Edinburgh District which Glasgow won 14-0. He was also picked for a combined Glasgow & Edinburgh side to play the Rest of Scotland in an international trial match that year.

References

1866 births
1939 deaths
Clydesdale RFC Glasgow rugby union players
Glasgow District (rugby union) players
Rugby union forwards
Rugby union players from Glasgow
Scotland international rugby union players
Scottish rugby union players